The 2017–18 Women's National Cricket League season was the 22nd season of the Women's National Cricket League, the women's domestic limited overs cricket competition in Australia. The tournament started on 6 October 2017 and finished on 24 February 2018. Defending champions New South Wales Breakers won the tournament for the 19th time after topping the ladder and beating Western Fury in the final.

Ladder

Fixtures

Round 1

Round 2

Round 3

Final

Statistics

Highest totals

Most runs

Most wickets

References

Notes

Bibliography

External links

 WNCL 2017–18 on cricket.com.au
 Series home at ESPNcricinfo

 
Women's National Cricket League seasons
 
Women's National Cricket League